Ernest Mummery (born 26 November 1935) is a New Zealand cricketer. He played in five first-class matches for Central Districts in 1961/62.

See also
 List of Central Districts representative cricketers

References

External links
 

1935 births
Living people
New Zealand cricketers
Central Districts cricketers
Cricketers from Whanganui